The A6 is a national road in Latvia, connecting Riga to the Belarusian border at Pāternieki. It bypasses Daugavpils in its north and passes through Krāslava and is also known as the Daugavpils Highway in Latvia.

The road is part of European route E22, European route E262 and the Latvian TEN-T road network. Once inside Belarus, the road becomes the Belarusian P20. Currently the A6 has two lanes in each direction between Riga and Ogre and between Nīcgale and Daugavpils, with other parts having just a single carriageway.

Since 2013 a shorter route has replaced the Salaspils-Koknese section of A6 (numbered as P80), mainly built for transit traffic. The construction of it was first started in the 1980s, but the plan was abandoned later. The first stage of the construction starts in Tīnuži and ends in Koknese. Between 2020 and 2027 the authorities plan to bring the new road into Riga. It would also have 2x2 lanes with an expressway/motorway status. There are also plans to continue the new road parallel to the A6 as far as Pļaviņas. The annual average daily traffic of the A6 in 2016 was 8,054 vehicles.

Crossings

Major cities crossed
Rīga
Salaspils
Ikšķile
Ogre
Ciemupe
Ķegums
Lielvārde
Dzelmes
Koknese
Pļaviņas
Jēkabpils
Līvāni
Jersika
Daugavpils
Krāslava

Gallery

References

External links
Autoceļš A6 in Google Maps

A06